Joanne Bonnar is a reporter, presenter and producer for STV News in Central Scotland.

Bonnar primarily works as a presenter on the STV News on STV Glasgow, and on the late bulletins on STV. Joanne also reports on a variety of stories across the West region.

References

External links

Living people
Scottish television presenters
STV News newsreaders and journalists
Scottish women television presenters
Scottish women journalists
Year of birth missing (living people)